The Randolphville Bridge, also known as the South Randolphville Road Bridge over Ambrose Brook, is a historic road bridge located on South Randolphville Road in the Randolphville section of Piscataway, New Jersey. It was added to the National Register of Historic Places on September 17, 1999.

See also
List of bridges on the National Register of Historic Places in New Jersey
Ephraim Fitz-Randolph House

References

External links

National Register of Historic Places in Middlesex County, New Jersey
Road bridges on the National Register of Historic Places in New Jersey
Bridges completed in 1937
Piscataway, New Jersey
New Jersey Register of Historic Places
Bridges in Middlesex County, New Jersey